A flexible intermediate bulk container (FIBC), jumbo, bulk bag, super sack, big bag, or tonne bag is an industrial container made of flexible fabric that is designed for storing and transporting dry, flowable products, such as sand, fertilizer, and granules of plastic.

A FIBC designed to transport  of material will itself only weigh .

Transporting and loading is done on either pallets or by lifting it from the loops. Bags are made with either one, two or four lifting loops. The single loop bag is suitable for one man operation as there is no need for a second man to put the loops on the loader hook. Emptying is made easy by a special opening in the bottom such as a discharge spout, of which there are several options, or by simply cutting it open.

History
Although there is disagreement on exactly where FIBCs were first made and used, it is certain that they have been employed for a variety of packaging purposes since the 1940s. These forerunners of the FIBC as we know it today were manufactured from PVC rubber and generally utilized within the rubber industry for the transportation of carbon black to be used as a reinforcing agent in a variety of rubber products.

By the 1960s, with the development of polypropylene combined with advances in weaving, the bulk bags as we know them today came into being and were rapidly adopted by a wide variety of oil and chemical companies to store and transport powdered and granular products.

It was during the oil crisis of the mid-1970s that the FIBC really came into its own for transporting huge quantities of cement to the Middle East from across Europe for the rapid expansion of the oil producing countries.

FIBCs are also being developed to hold and filter fluid products.

Types of Flexible Intermediate Bulk Container

Styles of Bag Construction:

Circular – This style of bag is made on the loom as a tube and is the lowest standard of FIBC. It will not maintain its shape when loaded and will sit down and bulge out in the middle.  It will resemble a tomato when loaded, as the product will stretch the fabric when it is subjected to the pressure of the product being loaded. Normally it would have cross corner lifting loops.

U-Panel – A U-panel bag is a step up from a circular bag, as it will have two pieces of fabric resembling a U shape that are sewn together to make the shape of the bag. It will maintain its square shape much better than the circular style.

Four-Panel – The four-panel bag is the best bag for staying square other than a baffle bag. It is made of up four pieces of fabric that make up the sides and one for the bottom.  These are all sewn together which resists the stretching tendencies of the bag and holds it in a cube shape much better.

Baffle – This style will be the best at keeping the cube shape of your product when the bag is loaded. It has additional baffles sewn down each corner to act as a pocket to fill each corner.  In addition, there are other pockets sewn on each side for all the product to gather around the baffles and pockets.  These are perfect if you have a small diameter product such as soybeans which can flow through the baffles without getting hung up.  These bulk bags will be easier to stack as they will make a nice square cube.

Specialty bags:
 Pharmaceutical - similar to food grade certifications
 UN certified - will have to undergo many tests to ensure it can withstand the stress and still eliminate spillage of hazardous material
 Food Grade - has to be manufactured in a clean room environment which is BRC or FDA approved
 Ventilated FIBC - used for potatoes and other fruits/vegetables for allowing the product to breathe

Different lift loop configurations:
 One Loop 
 Two Lift Loops
 4 Lift Loops

Types of lift loops
 Standard lift loops
 Cross corner lift loops

FIBC Bags with Liners
 Products that are dusting or hazardous will have to have a polypropylene liner inside the FIBC to eliminate sifting of the woven FIBC.
 Liners can be made from Polypropylene, Polyethylene, Nylon, or a metal (Foil) liner

Electrostatic properties
 Type – A – no special electrostatic safety features
 Type – B – Type B bags are not capable of generating propagating brush discharges. The wall of this FIBC exhibits a breakdown voltage of 4 kilovolts or less.
 Type – C – Conductive FIBC. Constructed from electrically conductive fabric, designed to control electrostatic charges by grounding. A standard fabric used contains conductive threads or tape.
 Type – D – Anti-static FIBCs, essentially refers to those bags which have anti-static or static dissipative properties without the requirement of grounding.

Used to transport
 Chemicals
 Pharmaceutical drugs
 Fertilizers
 Fiberglass
 Food products
 Grains
 Shotcrete
 Construction materials (sand, gravel)
 Pigments
 Plastics
 Refractories
 Seeds
 Salt
 Peanuts
 Starch
 Hazardous waste material - UN Rated
Flyash
 Minerals
 Cattle Feed
 Wool
 Scrap

Flood barrier use

Thailand utilized big bags to erect temporary walls to protect areas during the 2011 Thailand floods.  Walls built using big bags instead of smaller traditionally used sandbags were termed the big bag wall, or big bag barrier.

In North America, FIBCs are often used in flood prevention as well. An 1850 kg bag (4,070 lbs) has a foot print of at least 3 feet by 3 feet, and a height of almost 4 feet – building a solid wall of sand, 400 regular sized sandbags at a time.

Emptying FIBCs
Emptying a FIBC in order to process its contents must be performed on a station specifically designed for this purpose in order to cope with the various difficulties associated the handling FIBCs, which can weigh over 1000 kg. Those stations must be equipped with a crane to lift the FIBC, a safety cage to avoid risks related to fall, and a system to contain dust emission during discharge.

See also
 Intermediate bulk container
 Packaging

References

Further reading
 Yam, K. L., "Encyclopedia of Packaging Technology", John Wiley & Sons, 2009, 
 Guide for Handling Flexible Intermediate Bulk Containers, 
 BS EN 1898:2001   Specifications for flexible intermediate bulk containers (FIBCs) for non-dangerous goods

Packaging
Shipping containers